Piotrowice may refer to:

Piotrowice - Ochojec, a district of the city of Katowice (S Poland)
Piotrowice, Jawor County in Lower Silesian Voivodeship (south-west Poland)
Piotrowice, Kłodzko County in Lower Silesian Voivodeship (south-west Poland)
Piotrowice, Legnica County in Lower Silesian Voivodeship (south-west Poland)
Piotrowice, Polkowice County in Lower Silesian Voivodeship (south-west Poland)
Piotrowice, Strzelin County in Lower Silesian Voivodeship (south-west Poland)
Piotrowice, Środa Śląska County in Lower Silesian Voivodeship (south-west Poland)
Piotrowice, Lublin County in Lublin Voivodeship (east Poland)
Piotrowice, Łowicz County in Łódź Voivodeship (central Poland)
Piotrowice, Sieradz County in Łódź Voivodeship (central Poland)
Piotrowice, Puławy County in Lublin Voivodeship (east Poland)
Piotrowice, Ryki County in Lublin Voivodeship (east Poland)
Piotrowice, Oświęcim County in Lesser Poland Voivodeship (south Poland)
Piotrowice, Proszowice County in Lesser Poland Voivodeship (south Poland)
Piotrowice, Otwock County in Masovian Voivodeship (east-central Poland)
Piotrowice, Świętokrzyskie Voivodeship (south-central Poland)
Piotrowice, Radom County in Masovian Voivodeship (east-central Poland)
Piotrowice, Leszno County in Greater Poland Voivodeship (west-central Poland)
Piotrowice, Słupca County in Greater Poland Voivodeship (west-central Poland)
Piotrowice, Lubusz Voivodeship (west Poland)
Piotrowice, Nidzica County in Warmian-Masurian Voivodeship (north Poland)
Piotrowice, Nowe Miasto County in Warmian-Masurian Voivodeship (north Poland)
Piotrowice, West Pomeranian Voivodeship (north-west Poland)

See also
Petrovice u Karviné, village in the Czech Republic